Taqi al-Din Muhammad ibn Ahmad al-Fasi (8 September 1373, in Mecca, Hejaz – 6 July 1429, in Mecca, Hejaz) was an Arab Muslim scholar, hafith, faqih, historian, and Maliki qadi (judge) in Mecca.

He is best known for his works on the history of Mecca and its rulers and notable natives, which reached around 18 works. He also wrote on the genealogies of some Arab tribes of Tihamah.

Life 
He was born on Thursday, 8 September 1373 in Mecca, Hejaz, now Saudi Arabia,  but spent part of his early life in Medina He eventually returned to Mecca where he took knowledge from its scholars. His family claimed descent from the Islamic prophet Muhammad through his grandson, Hasan ibn Ali. He was a teacher of Maliki fiqh at the Ghiyathiyyah Madrasah in Makkah, which was considered one of the best Islamic institutions in the country and was funded by the Sultan of Bengal Ghiyasuddin Azam Shah. He went blind four years before his death in 1425 AD. He died on Wednesday 6 July 1429 at the age of 55 in Mecca, Hejaz, Arabian Peninsula, now Saudi Arabia.

Works 
 Al-ʻIqd al-thamīn fī tārīkh al-Balad al-Amīn (العقد الثمين فى تاريخ البلد الأمين): His largest and most important work, and probably the largest in the field of Meccan history, where he compiled the biographies of Meccans from the early days of Islam up until his time.
 Shifāʼ al-gharām bi-akhbār al-Balad al-Ḥarām (شفاء الغرام بأخبار البلد الحرام)
 Al-Muqniʻ min akhbār al-mulūk wa-al-khulafāʼ wa-wulāt Makkah al-shurafā (المقنع من أخبار الملوك والخلفاء وولاة مكة الشرفاء)
 Al-Zuhūr al-muqtaṭafah min tārīkh Makkah al-Musharrafah (الزهور المقتطفة من تاريخ مكة المشرفة)
 Dhayl al-taqīīd fī rūāh al-sunan wa al-masānīd (ذيل التقييد بمعرفة رواة السنن والمسانيد)

References 

Hadith scholars
15th-century Moroccan historians
Muslim scholars of Islamic jurisprudence
Maliki fiqh scholars
Sunni Muslim scholars of Islam
15th-century Muslim scholars of Islam
1373 births
1429 deaths
15th-century jurists
15th-century Arabs
14th-century Arabs
14th-century Moroccan historians